General elections were held in Sweden on 21 September 1952. The Social Democrats remained the largest party with 110 of the 230 seats in the Andra kammaren of the Riksdag and together with the Communist Party of Sweden they got 115 seats and the other parties 115 seats. Tage Erlander and his  Social Democratic Party did however form his second government with the Farmers' League already in 1951 and together with that party the Social Democrats now had a majority of 136 seats in the chamber and together with the Communists 141 seats. In the other indirectly elected chamber the Social Democrats had an absolute majority.

The Catalina affair had taken place a few months prior to the election and was highly debated during the time.

Results

References

General elections in Sweden
Sweden
General
Sweden